William Lort Mansel (2 April 1753 – 27 June 1820) was an English churchman and Cambridge fellow. He was Master of Trinity College, Cambridge from 1798 to his death in 1820, and also Bishop of Bristol from 1808 to 1820.

Life
He was born in Pembroke, the son of William Wogan Mansel and his wife Anne (née Lort), sister of Michael Lort, Regius Professor of Greek at Cambridge. He was educated at the King's School, Gloucester under Edward Sparkes, and at Trinity College, Cambridge (matriculated 1770, scholarship 1771, graduated B.A. 1774, M.A. 1777, D.D. 1798).

Elected a fellow of Trinity in 1775, Mansel was ordained deacon in 1780 and priest in 1783. He became Vicar of Bottisham 1783–1790, Vicar of Chesterton in 1788 and Rector of Fowlmere in 1789.

Mansel was known as a wit, writer of epigrams, and satirist of academic rivalries. His popularity led to his election as Public Orator of Cambridge, 1788–1798. Appointed Master of Trinity in 1798, Mansel served as University Vice-Chancellor 1799–1800. Appointed Bishop of Bristol in 1808 on the recommendation of his former pupil Spencer Perceval, the then Chancellor of the Exchequer, he combined the bishopric with his mastership until his death in 1820.

Mansel died in the Master's Lodge at Trinity College, Cambridge, and is interred in the College Chapel.

Family
Mansel married in 1779 Isabella Haggerston(e), daughter of John Haggerston, a Cambridge attorney: they had seven daughters and three sons, one of whom died young. On Mansel's death, his executors were Edward Daniel Clarke and James Devereux Hustler; his estate was left in will to his five unmarried daughters. The daughters included:

Isabella (died 1866 at age 76), married the Rev. Lort Mansel, a cousin.
Anne (died 1832), second daughter, married in 1819 to Edward Peacock, Fellow of Trinity and cleric.
Elizabeth, married 1823 James Devereux Hustler, Fellow of Trinity and cleric.
Fanny, married the Rev. Thomas Tayler of Whitlings.
Sophia Matilda Caroline, youngest daughter married 1823 the Rev. John Horsley Dakins.

References

External links
http://www.barwickinelmethistoricalsociety.com/3310.html

1753 births
1820 deaths
Masters of Trinity College, Cambridge
Bishops of Bristol
19th-century Church of England bishops
Cambridge University Orators
Vice-Chancellors of the University of Cambridge
People from Pembroke, Pembrokeshire
People educated at the King's School, Gloucester
Alumni of Trinity College, Cambridge
People from Bottisham
People from Fowlmere